The 1997–98 Red Stripe Bowl was the 24th edition of what is now the Regional Super50, the domestic limited-overs cricket competition for the countries of the West Indies Cricket Board (WICB). It ran from 4 to 20 October 1997, and was the first edition to bear that name.

Eight teams contested the competition – the six regular teams of West Indian domestic cricket (Barbados, Guyana, Jamaica, the Leeward Islands, Trinidad and Tobago, and the Windward Islands), plus two invited international teams from the ICC Americas region (Bermuda and Canada). All matches at the tournament were played either in Guyana or Jamaica, with the semi-finals and final played in the latter, in Discovery Bay. The Leeward Islands eventually defeated Guyana in the final to win their sixth domestic one-day title (and fourth in six seasons). Two Leeward Islands players, Keith Arthurton and Kenny Benjamin, led the tournament in runs and wickets, respectively.

Squads

Group stage

Zone A

Zone B

Finals

Quarter-finals

Semi-finals

Final

Statistics

Most runs
The top five run scorers (total runs) are included in this table.

Source: CricketArchive

Most wickets

The top five wicket takers are listed in this table, listed by wickets taken and then by bowling average.

Source: CricketArchive

References

1997 in West Indian cricket
West Indian cricket seasons from 1970–71 to 1999–2000
Regional Super50 seasons
Domestic cricket competitions in 1997–98